is a town located in Jinseki District, Hiroshima Prefecture, Japan.

Jinsekikōgen was created on November 5, 2004 from the merger of the towns of Jinseki, Yuki and Sanwa, and the village of Toyomatsu.  Before Toyomatsu was incorporated, it was the last remaining village within Hiroshima Prefecture.

As of May 1, 2017 population data, the town has an estimated population of 9,427 and a density of 25 persons per km². The total area is 381.81 km².

Geography

Climate
Jinsekikōgen has a humid subtropical climate (Köppen climate classification Cfa) characterized by cool to mild winters and hot, humid summers.

Demographics
Per Japanese census data, the population of Jinsekikōgen in 2020 is 8,250 people. Jinsekikōgen has been conducting censuses since 1960.

References

External links

Jinsekikogen official website 

Towns in Hiroshima Prefecture